Alan Terry Castell (born 6 August 1943) is a former English cricketer who played for Hampshire between 1961 and 1971. He was a right-handed lower-order batsman who began as a leg-break and googly bowler but later switched to medium-pace.

Castell shared in a Hampshire record 9th wicket stand of 230 with Danny Livingstone against Surrey in 1962. During the partnership Castell contributed 76 runs, which was also his highest first-class score.

References

External links
Alan Castell on ESPNcricinfo
Alan Castell on CricketArchive

Further reading
Stephen Chalke, Caught in the Memory, Fairfield Books, Bath, 1999, pp. 44–62

1943 births
Living people
English cricketers
Hampshire cricketers
International Cavaliers cricketers
Cricketers from Oxford